Il barbiere di Siviglia, ovvero La precauzione inutile (The Barber of Seville, or The Useless Precaution) is a comic opera by Giovanni Paisiello to a libretto by Giuseppe Petrosellini, even though his name is not identified on the score's title page.

It was adapted from the 1775 play Le Barbier de Séville of Pierre Beaumarchais. The full title for the opera reads: Il barbiere di Siviglia, ovvero La Precauzione inutile, dramma giocoso per musica tradotto liberamente dal francese, da rappresentarsi nel Teatro Imperiale del corte, l'anno 1782 (Trans: "The Barber of Seville, or The Useless Precaution, comical drama with music freely translated from the French, presented at the Imperial Court Theater, the year 1782").

The story essentially follows the original Beaumarchais play, and in some places directly translates songs and dialogue. The plots of the Paisiello and the Rossini versions very closely resemble each other, with subtle differences. Petrosellini's libretto puts a greater emphasis on the love story and less on the comic qualities.

Performance history
Several musical adaptations of Il barbiere di Siviglia predated the version by Paisiello, but Paisiello's comic opera was the first to achieve widespread success. It was subsequently staged in several cities in the years immediately following its premiere, including  Vienna, where Il barbiere played at five venues from 1783 until 1804, both in Italian and German, and received nearly 100 performances, and Naples (1783); Warsaw, Prague, Versailles (1784); Kassel, Pressburg, Mannheim (1785); Liège, Cologne (1786); Madrid and Barcelona (1787); for the 1787 production in Naples at the Teatro dei Fiorentini, the opera was reduced to three acts and Pasiello wrote three new numbers: "La carta che bramate" for Rosina, "Serena il bel sembiante" for Almaviva, and a finale for act one. In 1788 the opera was given in Berlin, followed by London and Paris (1789); Lisbon (1791); Brussels (1793); Stockholm (1797); and New Orleans (1801).

In 1789, Mozart dedicated the aria "Schon lacht der holde Frühling" (K. 580) to his sister-in-law Josepha Hofer as a substitute for Rosina's original act 3 aria ("Già riede primavera"). Although it is missing only the closing ritornello, the incomplete orchestration suggests it was never used.

The opera proved to be Paisiello's biggest success. Even after the tumultuous  1816 premiere of Rossini's own version, Paisiello's version continued to be more popular by comparison. With time, however, that situation changed. As Rossini's version gained in popularity, Paisiello's diminished in parallel, to the point where it fell from the repertoire.

Paisiello's version did receive revival in later years, including Paris (1868); Turin (1875); Berlin (1913); and Monte Carlo (1918). In 2005 Bampton Classical Opera gave performances of Paisiello's opera in English.

Roles

Recordings
 Mercury SR 2-9010: Graziella Sciutti, Nicola Monti, Rolando Panerai, Renato Capecchi, Mario Petri; Virtuosi di Roma; Renato Fasano, conductor
 Hungaroton SLPD MZS-27: Dénes Gulyas, Krisztina Laki, József Gregor, István Gáti, Sándor Sólyom-Nagy, Csaba Réti, Miklós Mersei, Gábor Vághelyi, Attila Fülöp; Hungarian State Orchestra; Ádám Fischer, conductor
 Dynamic S417: Stefano Consolini, Pietro Spagnoli, Anna Maria Dell'Oste, Angelo Nardinocchi, Luciano Di Pasquale; Orchestra del Teatro Lirico G.Verdi di Trieste; Giuliano Carella, conductor

In popular culture
 The Count's serenade "Saper bramate" is used in Stanley Kubrick's period film Barry Lyndon.

References

Further reading
Holden, Amanda (ed.), The New Penguin Opera Guide, New York: Penguin Putnam, 2001. 
Lazarevich, Gordana, Barbiere di Siviglia, Il (i), in Sadie, Stanley (ed.), The New Grove Dictionary of Opera, New York: Grove (Oxford University Press), 1997, I, pp. 309–311.

External links
 
 Libretto

Operas by Giovanni Paisiello
Italian-language operas
Operas
1782 operas
Operas based on plays
Operas set in Spain
Operas based on The Barber of Seville (play)